Erin may refer to:
Erin, Jasper County, Texas
Erin Station, Texas, a former name for the Mykawa neighborhood of Houston